

Max Lindig (11 July 1887 – 26 April 1961) was a general in the Wehrmacht of Nazi Germany during World War II. He was a recipient of the Knight's Cross of the Iron Cross.

Awards

 Knight's Cross of the Iron Cross on 27 July 1944 as Generalleutnant and Höherer Artilleriekommandeur 307

References

Citations

Bibliography

 

1887 births
1961 deaths
Military personnel from Berlin
Lieutenant generals of the German Army (Wehrmacht)
German Army personnel of World War I
Prussian Army personnel
Recipients of the clasp to the Iron Cross, 1st class
Recipients of the Gold German Cross
Recipients of the Knight's Cross of the Iron Cross
German prisoners of war in World War II
Reichswehr personnel
People from the Province of Brandenburg
German Army generals of World War II